Negha meridionalis is a species of square-headed snakefly in the family Inocelliidae. It is found in North America.

References

Further reading

 
 
 

Raphidioptera
Articles created by Qbugbot
Insects described in 1988